Marcos Libedinsky Tschorne (13 February 1933 – 22 August 2021) was a Chilean judge who served as president of the Supreme Court.

References

1933 births
2021 deaths
People from Santiago
Chilean Jews
20th-century Chilean judges
Supreme Court of Chile members
University of Chile alumni
Academic staff of the University of Chile
Recipients of the Order of Prince Henry
21st-century Chilean judges